Harold Adrian Milne Barbour (1874–1938) was a unionist politician in Northern Ireland.

Biography
Harold Adrian Milne Barbour, son of J. D. Barbour of Lisburn, studied at Harrow School and Brasenose College, Oxford before assuming the directorship of a linen company in Glasgow at some time before 1911. He was elected as an Irish Unionist Party county councillor, then served in the Senate of Northern Ireland from 1921 to 1929.

Barbour was also active in the co-operative movement in Ireland, and his photographs of rural north and west Ireland in the early years of the 20th-century have been widely exhibited.

References

1874 births
1938 deaths
Alumni of Brasenose College, Oxford
Councillors in Northern Ireland
Members of the Senate of Northern Ireland 1921–1925
Members of the Senate of Northern Ireland 1925–1929
People educated at Harrow School
Ulster Unionist Party members of the Senate of Northern Ireland
British cooperative organizers